María Amanda Monterroso Asteguieta (born 30 November 1993) is a Guatemalan footballer who plays as a forward for Spanish Primera Nacional club CD Badajoz and the Guatemala women's national team. She is the sister of Coralia Monterroso.

International goals
Scores and results list Guatemala's goal tally first.

See also
 List of Guatemala women's international footballers

References

External links

1993 births
Living people
Sportspeople from Guatemala City
Guatemalan women's footballers
Women's association football forwards
Lyon College alumni
Grand Canyon Antelopes women's soccer players
Alianza Petrolera players
Extremadura UD footballers
Guatemala women's international footballers
Central American Games bronze medalists for Guatemala
Central American Games medalists in football
Guatemalan expatriate footballers
Guatemalan expatriate sportspeople in the United States
Expatriate women's soccer players in the United States
Guatemalan expatriate sportspeople in Colombia
Expatriate women's footballers in Colombia
Guatemalan expatriate sportspeople in Spain
Expatriate women's footballers in Spain